Zali may refer to:
 Zali, Kurdistan (زلي - Zalī)
 Zali, North Khorasan (زالي - Zālī)